The State of Vietnam (Chữ Nôm: 國家越南) was a governmental entity in Southeast Asia that existed from 1949 until 1955, first as a member of the French Union and later as a country (from 21 July 1954 to 26 October 1955). The state claimed authority over all of Vietnam during the First Indochina War, although large parts of its territory were controlled by the Democratic Republic of Vietnam. 

The state was created in 1949 by France as part of the French Union and was internationally recognised in 1950. Former Emperor Bảo Đại became Chief of State. After the 1954 Geneva Agreements, the State of Vietnam abandoned its sovereignty over the northern part of the country, which was controlled by the Việt Minh. Ngô Đình Diệm was appointed prime minister the same year and—after having ousted Bảo Đại in 1955—became president of the Republic of Vietnam.

History

Unification of Vietnam (1947–48)
Since the August Revolution, the Việt Minh had seized all of the territories of Vietnam. The Democratic Republic of Vietnam was established by the Việt Minh on September 2, 1945 (the same day Japan signed surrender documents with the United States).

By February 1947, following the pacification of Tonkin (Northern Vietnam), the Tonkinese capital, Hanoi, and the main traffic axis returned to French control. The Việt Minh partisans were forced to retreat into the jungle and prepared to pursue the war using guerrilla warfare.

In order to reduce Việt Minh leader Hồ Chí Minh’s influence over the Vietnamese population, the French authorities in Indochina supported the return to power of Bảo Đại (the last emperor of the Nguyễn Dynasty), by establishing puppet states, including the State of Vietnam. Bao Dai had voluntarily abdicated on August 25, 1945, after the fall of the short-lived Empire of Vietnam, a puppet state of the Empire of Japan.

On June 5, 1948, the Halong Bay Agreements (Accords de la baie d’Along) allowed the creation of a unified Vietnamese government replacing the governments of Tonkin (North Vietnam) and Annam (Middle Vietnam) associated to France within the French Union and the Indochinese Federation then including the neighboring Kingdom of Laos and Kingdom of Cambodia. Cochinchina (South Vietnam), however, had a different status, both as a colony and as an autonomous republic, and its reunification with the rest of Vietnam had to be approved by its local assembly, and then by the French National Assembly. During the transitional period, a Provisional Central Government of Vietnam was proclaimed: Nguyễn Văn Xuân, until then head of the Provisional Government of South Vietnam (as Cochinchina had been known since 1947) became its president, while Bảo Đại waited for a complete reunification to take office.

However, the Democratic Republic of Vietnam had declared the independence of Vietnam and had control of almost all of Vietnam's territory since September 2, 1945. Besides that, the DRV had also hosted the 1946 Vietnamese National Assembly election with the participation of 89% of Vietnamese voters (north and south). The Democratic Republic of Vietnam had officially become the constitutional representatives of Vietnam in 1946.

Since the Halong Bay Agreements resulted in many aspects—excluding the referendum—in the enforcement of the March 6, 1946, Indochinese Independence Convention signed by Communist Hồ Chí Minh's Democratic Republic of Vietnam and High Commissioner of France in Indochina Admiral Thierry d'Argenlieu, representative of Félix Gouin's Provisional French Republic led by the French Section of the Workers' International (SFIO), some regarded the State of Vietnam as a puppet state of the French Fourth Republic.

French Union (1949–54)

On May 20, 1949, the French National Assembly approved the reunification of Cochinchina with the rest of Vietnam. The decision took effect on June 4 and the State of Vietnam was officially proclaimed on July 2. From 1949 to 1954, after reunification with Cochinchina, the State of Vietnam had partial autonomy from France as an associated state within the French Union.

Bảo Đại fought against communist leader Hồ Chí Minh for legitimacy as the legitimate government of Vietnam through the struggle between the Vietnamese National Army and the Việt Minh during the First Indochina War.

The State of Vietnam found support in the French Fourth Republic and the United States (1950–1954) while Hồ Chí Minh was backed by the People's Republic of China (since 1950), and to a lesser extent by the Soviet Union. Despite French support, roughly 60% of Vietnamese territory was under Việt Minh control in 1952.

Partition (1954–55)

After the Geneva Conference of 1954, as well as becoming fully independent with its departure from the French Union, the State of Vietnam became territorially confined to those lands of Vietnam south of the 17th parallel, and as such became commonly known as Republic of Vietnam. Communist forces entered Hanoi on 10 October 1954. 

The massive semi-voluntary migration of anti-communist north Vietnamese, essentially Roman Catholic people, proceeded during the French-American Operation Passage to Freedom from 1954 to 1955.

Politics

Provisional Central Government of Vietnam (1948–49)
On May 27, 1948, Nguyễn Văn Xuân, then President of the Republic of Cochinchina, became President of the Provisional Central Government of Vietnam (Thủ tướng lâm thời) following the merging of the government of Cochin China and Vietnam in what is sometimes referred as "Pre-Vietnam".

State of Vietnam (1949–55)
On June 14, 1949, Bảo Đại was appointed Chief of State (Quốc trưởng) of the State of Vietnam; he was concurrently Prime Minister for a short while (Kiêm nhiệm Thủ tướng).

On October 26, 1955, the Republic of Vietnam was established and Ngô Đình Diệm became the first President of the Republic.

Leaders (1948–55)

1955 referendum, Republic of Vietnam

In South Vietnam, a referendum was scheduled for 23 October 1955 to determine the future direction of the south, in which the people would choose Diệm or Bảo Đại as the leader of South Vietnam. During the election, Diệm's brother Ngô Đình Nhu and the Cần Lao Party supplied Diệm's electoral base in organizing and supervising the elections, especially the propaganda campaign for destroying Bảo Đại's reputation. Supporters of Bảo Đại were not allowed to campaign, and were physically attacked by Nhu's workers. Official results showed 98.2 per cent of voters favoured Diệm, an implausibly high result that was condemned as fraudulent. The total number of votes far exceeded the number of registered voters by over 380,000, further evidence that the referendum was heavily rigged. For example, only 450,000 voters were registered in Saigon, but 605,025 were said to have voted for Diệm. On 26 October, Diệm proclaimed the Republic of Vietnam—widely known as South Vietnam—whose reformed army, with American assistance, pursued the conflict with North Vietnam; the Việt Cộng replaced the Viet Minh, in the Vietnam War.

Military

Vietnamese National Army (1949–55)

Following the signing of the 1949 Élysée Accords in Paris, Bảo Đại was able to create a National Army for defense purposes.

It fought under the State of Vietnam's banner and leadership and was commanded by General Nguyễn Văn Hinh.

Economy

Currency 
 

The currency used within the French Union was the French Indochinese piastre. Notes were issued and managed by the "Issue Institute of the States of Cambodia, Laos and Vietnam" (Institut d’Emission des Etats du Cambodge, du Laos et du Viêt-Nam).

Administrative divisions

Autonomous regions  
 

Following the creation of the State of Vietnam and the establishment of its government, the Chief of State Bảo Đại signed the two ordinances related to the administration and local governance of the State of Vietnam, namely Ordinance No. 1 ("Organisation and Operation of civil authorities in Vietnam") and Ordinance No. 2 ("Statutes of Government office"). These ordinances divided the State of Vietnam into three large autonomous regions, namely Bắc Việt (former Tonkin), Trung Việt (former Annam), and Nam Việt (former Cochinchina), the local government of each autonomous region was headed by a Thủ hiến (Governour).

On 4 August 1954 the government of the State of Vietnam enacted Ordinance No. 21 which abolished the autonomous status of the three regions and abolished the post of regional governour, replacing them with central government representatives in all parts of its territory. The three regions were renamed to Bắc phần, Trung phần, and Nam phần.

Domain of the Crown 

The Domain of the Crown (French: Domaine de la Couronne) was originally the Nguyễn dynasty's geopolitical concept for its protectorates and principalities where the Kinh ethnic group didn't make up the majority, later it became a type of administrative unit of the State of Vietnam. It was officially established on 15 April 1950 and dissolved on 11 March 1955. In the areas of the Domain of the Crown Chief of State Bảo Đại was still officially (and legally) titled as the "Emperor of the Nguyễn dynasty".

The Domain of the Crown contained the following five provinces established from the former Montagnard country of South Indochina:

 Đồng Nai Thượng
 Lâm Viên
 Pleiku
 Darlac
 Kontum

In Bắc phần it contained the following provinces:

 Hòa Bình (Mường Autonomous Territory)
 Phong Thổ (Thái Autonomous Territory)
 Lai Châu (Thái Autonomous Territory)
 Sơn La (Thái Autonomous Territory)
 Lào Kay (Mèo Autonomous Territory)
 Hà Giang (Mèo Autonomous Territory)
 Bắc Kạn (Thổ Autonomous Territory)
 Cao Bằng (Thổ Autonomous Territory)
 Lạng Sơn (Thổ Autonomous Territory)
 Hải Ninh (Nùng Autonomous Territory)
 Móng Cái (Nùng Autonomous Territory)

See also
First Indochina War
French Indochina
French Indochinese piastre
History of Vietnam
Vietnamese National Army
War in Vietnam

References

Bibliography

Specialized sources

External links

States and territories established in 1949
Former polities of the Indochina Wars
States and territories disestablished in 1955
State of Vietnam
State of Vietnam
State of Vietnam
Provisional governments